Princess Ulrike Friederike Wilhelmine of Hesse-Kassel (31 October 1722, Kassel – 28 February 1787, Eutin) was a member of the House of Hesse-Kassel by birth, and of the House of Holstein-Gottorp through her marriage to Frederick Augustus I, Duke of Oldenburg. Ulrike was the Duchess consort of Oldenburg from 1774 until her husband's death on 6 July 1785.

Marriage and issue
Ulrike married Prince Frederick Augustus of Holstein-Gottorp, son of Christian August, Duke of Holstein-Gottorp and his wife Margravine Albertine Friederike of Baden-Durlach, on 21 November 1752 in Kassel. Ulrike and Frederick Augustus had three children:
 Peter Friedrich Wilhelm, Duke of Oldenburg (born 3 January 1754)
 Luise of Holstein-Gottorp-Oldenburg (born 2 October 1756, died 1759)
 Hedwig Sophie Charlotte of Holstein-Gottorp-Oldenburg (born 22 March 1759)

Ancestry

References

1722 births
1787 deaths
House of Hesse-Kassel
Duchesses of Oldenburg
Nobility from Kassel